Brazil is the 10th largest energy consumer in the world and the largest in South America. At the same time, it is an important oil and gas producer in the region and the world's second largest ethanol fuel producer. The government agencies responsible for energy policy are the Ministry of Mines and Energy (MME), the National Council for Energy Policy (CNPE), the National Agency of Petroleum, Natural Gas and Biofuels (ANP) and the National Agency of Electricity (ANEEL). State-owned companies Petrobras and Eletrobras are the major players in Brazil's energy sector, as well as Latin America's.

Overview

Total energy matrix and Electric energy matrix

The main characteristic of the Brazilian energy matrix is that it is much more renewable than that of the world. While in 2019 the world matrix was only 14% made up of renewable energy, Brazil's was at 45%. Petroleum and oil products made up 34.3% of the matrix; sugar cane derivatives, 18%; hydraulic energy, 12.4%; natural gas, 12.2%; firewood and charcoal, 8.8%; varied renewable energies, 7%; mineral coal, 5.3%; nuclear, 1.4%, and other non-renewable energies, 0.6%.

In the electric energy matrix, the difference between Brazil and the world is even greater: while the world only had 25% of renewable electric energy in 2019, Brazil had 83%. The Brazilian electric matrix is composed of: hydraulic energy, 64.9%; biomass, 8.4%; wind energy, 8.6%; solar energy, 1%; natural gas, 9.3%; oil products, 2%; nuclear, 2.5%; coal and derivatives, 3.3%.

Reforms of the energy sector
At the end of the 1990s and the beginning of the 2000s, Brazil's energy sector underwent market liberalization. In 1997, the Petroleum Investment Law was adopted, establishing a legal and regulatory framework, and liberalizing oil production. It created the CNPE and the ANP, increased use of natural gas, increased competition in the energy market, and increased investment in power generation. The state monopoly on oil and gas exploration ended, and energy subsidies were reduced. However, the government retained monopoly control of key energy complexes and regulated the price of certain energy products.

Current government policies concentrate mainly on improving energy efficiency in both residential and industrial sectors, as well as increasing use of renewable energy. Further restructuring of the energy sector will be one of the key issues for ensuring sufficient energy investments to meet the rising need for fuel and electricity.

Primary energy sources

Oil

Brazil is the world's 8th-largest oil producer. Up to 1997, the government-owned Petróleo Brasileiro S.A. (Petrobras) had a monopoly on oil. More than 50 oil companies now are engaged in oil exploration. It is also a major distributor of oil products, and owns oil refineries and oil tankers.

In 2006, Brazil had  the second-largest proven oil reserves in South America after Venezuela. The vast majority of proven reserves were located in the Campos and Santos offshore basins off the southeast coast of Brazil.

Brazil has been a net exporter of oil since 2011. However, the country still imports some light oil from the Middle East, because several refineries, built in the 1960s and 1970s under the military government, are not suited to process the heavy oil in Brazilian reserves, discovered decades later.

Transpetro, a wholly owned subsidiary of Petrobras, operates a crude oil transport network.

Natural gas

At the end of 2017, the proven reserves of Brazil's natural gas were 369 x 109 m³, with possible reserves expected to be 2 times higher. Until recently natural gas was produced as a by-product of the oil industry. The main reserves in use are located at Campos and Santos Basins. Other natural gas basins include Foz do Amazonas, Ceara e Potiguar, Pernambuco e Paraíba,
Sergipe/Alagoas, Espírito Santo and Amazonas (onshore). Petrobras controls over 90 percent of Brazil’s natural gas reserves.

Brazil's inland gas pipeline systems are operated by Petrobras subsidiary Transpetro. In 2005, construction began on the Gas Unificação (Gasun pipeline) which will link Mato Grosso do Sul in southwest Brazil, to Maranhão in the northeast. China’s Sinopec is a contractor for the Gasene pipeline, which will link the northeast and southeast networks. Petrobras is also constructing the Urucu-Manaus pipeline, which will link the Urucu gas reserves to power plants in the state of Amazonas.

In 2005, the gas production was 18.7 x 109 m³, which is less than the natural gas consumption of Brazil. Gas imports come mainly from Bolivia's Rio Grande basin through the Bolivia-Brazil gas pipeline (Gasbol pipeline), from Argentina through the Transportadora de Gas de Mercosur pipeline (Paraná-Uruguaiana pipeline), and from LNG imports. Brazil has held talks with Venezuela and Argentina about building a new pipeline system Gran Gasoducto del Sur linking the three countries; however, the plan has not moved beyond the planning stages.

Coal
Brazil has total coal reserves of about 30 billion tonnes, but the deposits vary by the quality and quantity. The proved recoverable reserves are around 10 billion tonnes. In 2004 Brazil produced 5.4 million tonnes of coal, while coal consumption reached 21.9 million tonnes. Almost all of Brazil’s coal output is steam coal, of which about 85% is fired in power stations. Reserves of sub-bituminous coal are located mostly in the states of Rio Grande do Sul, Santa Catarina and Paraná.

Oil shale

Brazil has the world's second largest known oil shale (the Irati shale and lacustrine deposits) resources and has second largest shale oil production after Estonia. Oil shale resources lie in São Mateus do Sul, Paraná, and in Vale do Paraíba. Brazil has developed the world’s largest surface oil shale pyrolysis retort Petrosix, operated by  Petrobras. Production in 1999 was about 200,000 tonnes.

Uranium

Brazil has the 6th largest uranium reserves in the world. Deposits of uranium are found in eight different states of Brazil. Proven reserves are 162,000 tonnes. Cumulative production at the end of 2002 was less than 1,400 tonnes. The Poços de Caldas production centre in Minas Gerais state was shut down in 1997 and was replaced by a new plant at Lagoa Real in Bahia. There is a plan to build another production center at Itatiaia.

Electricity

Power sector reforms were launched in the mid-1990s and a new regulatory framework was applied in 2004. In 2004, Brazil had 86.5 GW of installed generating capacity and it produced 387 Twh of electricity. As of today 66% of distribution and 28% of power generation is owned by private companies. In 2004, 59 companies operated in power generation and 64 in electricity distribution.

The major power company is Centrais Elétricas Brasileiras (Eletrobrás), which together with its subsidiaries generates and transmits approximately 60% of Brazil's electric supply. The largest private-owned power company is Tractebel Energia. An independent system operator ( - ((ONS)), responsible for the technical coordination of electricity dispatching and the management of transmission services, and a wholesale market were created in 1998.

During the electricity crisis in 2001, the government launched a program to build 55 gas-fired power stations with a total capacity of 22 GW, but only 19 power stations were built, with a total capacity of 4,012 MW.

Hydropower

Brazil is the third largest hydroelectricity producer in the world after China and Canada. The gross theoretical capability exceeds 3,000 TWh per annum, of which 800 TWh per annum is economically exploitable. In 2004, Brazil produced 321TWh of hydropower. In 2019, Brazil had 217 hydroelectric plants in operation, with an installed capacity of 98,581 MW, 60.16% of the country's energy generation. At the end of 2021 Brazil was the 2nd country in the world in terms of installed hydroelectric power (109.4 GW).

In total electricity generation, in 2019 Brazil reached 170,000 megawatts of installed capacity, more than 75% from renewable sources (the majority, hydroelectric plants).

In 2013, the Southeast used about 50% of the load of the National Integrated System (SIN), being the main energy consuming region in the country. The region's installed electricity generation capacity totaled almost 42,500 MW, which represented about a third of Brazil's generation capacity. The hydroelectric generation represented 58% of the installed capacity in the region, with the remaining 42% basically corresponding to the thermoelectric generation. São Paulo accounted for 40% of this capacity; Minas Gerais by about 25%; Rio de Janeiro by 13.3%; and Espírito Santo for the rest.

The South Region  has the Itaipu Dam, which was the largest hydroelectric plant in the world for several years, until the inauguration of the Three Gorges Dam in China. Remains the world's second largest operational hydroelectric power plant. Brazil co-owns the Itaipu Dam with Paraguay: the dam is on the Paraná River, located on the border between the countries. It has an installed generation capacity of 14 GW by 20 generating units of 700 MW each.

Northern Brazil has large hydroelectric plants such as Belo Monte and Tucuruí, which produce much of the national energy.

Brazil's hydroelectric potential has not yet been fully explored, so the country still has the capacity to build several renewable energy plants in its territory.

Wind energy

In July 2022 Brazil reached 22 GW of installed wind power. In 2021 Brazil was the 7th country in the world in terms of installed wind power (21 GW), and the 4th largest producer of wind energy in the world (72 TWh), behind only China, USA and Germany.

Brazil's gross wind resource potential was estimated, in 2019, to be about 522 GW (this, only onshore), enough energy to meet three times the country's current demand.  according to ONS, total installed capacity was 18.9 GW, with average capacity factor of 58%. While the world average wind production capacity factors is 24.7%, there are areas in Northern Brazil, specially in Bahia State, where some wind farms record with average capacity factors over 60%; the average capacity factor in the Northeast Region is 45% in the coast and 49% in the interior. In 2019, wind energy represented 9% of the energy generated in the country. In 2020 Brazil was the 8th country in the world in terms of installed wind power (17.2 GW); in November 2021 Brazil reached 20 GW of installed wind power.

Solar power

In October 2022 Brazil reached 21 GW of installed solar power.  In 2021, Brazil was the 14th country in the world in terms of installed solar power (13 GW), and the 11th largest producer of solar energy in the world (16.8 TWh).

 according to ONS, total installed capacity of photovoltaic solar was 10.5 GW, with average capacity factor of 21%. Some of the most irradiated Brazilian States are MG ("Minas Gerais"), BA ("Bahia") and GO (Goiás), which have indeed world irradiation level records. In 2019, solar power represented 1,27% of the energy generated in the country. In 2020, Brazil was the 14th country in the world in terms of installed solar power (7.8 GW).

Nuclear energy

Nuclear energy accounts for about 4% of Brazil's electricity. The nuclear power generation monopoly is owned by Eletronuclear (Eletrobrás Eletronuclear S/A), a wholly owned subsidiary of Eletrobrás. Nuclear energy is produced by two reactors at Angra. It is located at the Central Nuclear Almirante Álvaro Alberto (CNAAA) on the Praia de Itaorna in Angra dos Reis, Rio de Janeiro. It consists of two pressurized water reactors, Angra I, with capacity of 657 MW, connected to the power grid in 1982, and Angra II, with capacity of 1,350 MW, connected in 2000. A third reactor, Angra III, with a projected output of 1,350 MW, is planned to be finished by 2014 and work has been paralyzed due to environmental concerns, but the licenses are being approved and the heavy construction work will start in 2009. By 2025 Brazil plans to build seven more reactors.

Brazil signed a nuclear cooperation agreement with Argentina since 1991.

Biofuels

In 2020, Brazil was the 2nd largest country in the world in the production of energy through biomass (energy production from solid biofuels and renewable waste), with 15,2 GW installed.

Due to its ethanol fuel production, Brazil has sometimes been described as a bio-energy superpower. Ethanol fuel is produced from sugar cane. Brazil has the largest sugar cane crop in the world, and is the largest exporter of ethanol in the world.  With the 1973 oil crisis, the Brazilian government initiated in 1975 the Pró-Álcool program. The Pró-Álcool or Programa Nacional do Álcool (National Alcohol Program) was a nationwide program financed by the government to phase out all automobile fuels derived from fossil fuels  in favour of ethanol. The program successfully reduced by 10 million the number of cars running on gasoline in Brazil, thereby reducing the country's dependence on oil imports.

The production and consumption of biodiesel is expected to reach to 2% of diesel fuel in 2008 and 5% in 2013.

Brazil's peat reserves are estimated at 25 billion tonnes, the highest in South America. However, no production of peat for fuel has yet been developed. Brazil produces 65 million tonnes of fuelwood per year. The annual production of charcoal is about 6 million tonnes, used in the steel industry. The cogeneration potential of agricultural and livestock residues varies from 4 GW to 47 GW by 2025.

References

Further reading 
 Silvestre, B. S., Dalcol, P. R. T. (2009) Geographical proximity and innovation: Evidences from the Campos Basin oil & gas industrial agglomeration — Brazil. Technovation, Vol. 29 (8), pp. 546–561.

External links 
 Brazilian Ministry of Mines and Energy
 Brazilian National Electric Energy Agency